Donkey Kong Country is a computer animated musical television series that is based on the video game Donkey Kong Country from Nintendo and Rare. The series was co-produced by Nelvana, Medialab Studio L.A. (Season 1) and Hong Guang Animation (Season 2), in association with WIC Entertainment, with the participation of Teletoon—for Season 1, it was produced in co-production with France 2, Canal+, in association with Valar 4.

The show was first introduced in France on September 4, 1996, on France 2, on a hybrid live action and motion capture animated block titled La Planète de Donkey Kong (The Planet of Donkey Kong). Later, the show premiered as a full series on August 15, 1997, until the final episode's ending on July 7, 2000.

Donkey Kong Country was one of the earliest television shows to be primarily animated with motion capture technology. Several elements of the series, such as the Crystal Coconut, appeared in later Donkey Kong video games like Donkey Kong 64, which was released three years after the show began airing on television. The second season was produced by Taiwanese CGI studio CGCG—which updated the character models, silkier lighting, and used key framing—having been announced as early as May 1999.

Plot
Taking place on Kongo Bongo Island, the show focuses on Donkey Kong and Diddy Kong as they protect a magical artifact known as the Crystal Coconut from the villainous King K. Rool and his Kremling army who long to steal it in order to rule Kongo Bongo. Each episode features two songs performed by the show's various characters.

Characters

Game characters 
 Donkey Kong - the strong but slow-witted future ruler of Kongo Bongo Island, tasked with guarding the Crystal Coconut. A bit of a slacker, he loves to eat bananas, which are often his main motivation for solving problems. His catchphrase is, "Banana Slamma!"
 Diddy Kong - DK's excitable sidekick and buddy, who loves to cause mischief and is a fan of movies and TV. He and DK often take turns acting as the voice of reason for one another.
 Cranky Kong - DK and Diddy's wise, but ill-tempered mentor. He enjoys playing the organ and making potions to solve the heroes’ problems; the latter was soon carried over into Donkey Kong 64. The Crystal Coconut is stored in a globe inside his treehouse.
 Funky Kong - an eccentric, laid-back friend of DK, who speaks in a Jamaican accent, believes in the spiritual, and is also fond of surfing. Much like in the games, he owns Funky's Flights and often flies the others around the island in order to help them get around quickly, although he is noted to be rather incompetent at piloting.
 Candy Kong - DK's headstrong yet short-tempered girlfriend who works at the Bluster Barrelworks Factory as its only employee. She frequently pines for a promotion from her boss and has even fantasized about owning the factory. She is usually DK's main motivation to do the right thing, tied with bananas.
 Dixie Kong - Diddy's sweet but naïve girlfriend, and Candy's best friend, who has a habit of losing her pets. She is the only Kong in the show who originated in Donkey Kong Country 2: Diddy’s Kong Quest.
 King K. Rool - the show's main villain, who constantly attempts to steal the Crystal Coconut and take over the island. This version speaks in an English dialect and lives in a cave resembling a reptilian skull.
 Krusha - K. Rool's dull-witted bodyguard.
 Klump - K. Rool's spineless and clumsy general, who speaks in a thick southern United States accent.
 Kritters - K. Rool's soldiers.
 Klaptraps - small crocodiles who like to eat wooden surfaces in a manner similar to termites. They are fired out of Klap-Blasters by the Kritters and usually give comments on whatever they are eating.

Show-exclusive characters 
 Bluster Kong - the wealthy, morally ambiguous boss of the Bluster Barrelworks factory, who is jealous of Donkey Kong and continually makes unsuccessful attempts to romance Candy. He has a massive ego but is actually quite cowardly. A running gag involves him calling his disapproving mother, from whom he will soon inherit the factory, to bail him out.
 Kaptain Skurvy - a pirate captain and Klump's long-lost twin brother. He persists in chasing the Crystal Coconut, claiming it to be the birthright of one of his ancestors.
 Kutlass & Green Kroc - Skurvy's minions.
 Polly Roger the Parrot - a pet parrot of Kaptain Skurvy.
 Junior the Klaptrap - a large Klaptrap who frequently has his dentures stolen, and will do a favor for anyone who retrieves them for him.
 Eddie the Mean Old Yeti - a primitive, white-furred yeti who lives in the White Mountains.
 Inka Dinka Doo - the temple god from whence the Crystal Coconut came. It was he who selected Donkey Kong to be the future ruler. He appears as a stone column on which expressions are carved. One stone block turns around to show the appropriate expression for his mood.

Voice cast
Season 1 of the French version was done in Quebec, with the exception of Donkey Kong, Diddy Kong and Funky Kong's voice actors who are from France. Season 2 was not given a French version until later when it got released on DVD years afterward, which had a new voice cast and it was done in France, with DK and Funky's voice actors reprising their character roles. Hervé Grull never returned as Diddy Kong, as he had long since hit puberty, replaced by Lucile Boulanger as a result.

Episodes

Production
Over seventy percent of the character animation in the series was produced using performance capture. Two performers were required for each character; one performed the character's body movements, while the other used hand movements to control the character's face. The limitations of the technology used meant that actions like picking an object up could not be produced with this method and had to be keyframed. This process allowed the character animation of one episode to be completed in two weeks, as compared to the six to eight weeks keyframed animation was estimated to require for the same length.

Telecast and home media
Donkey Kong Country was first introduced in France on September 4, 1996, on France 2, on a block titled La Planète de Donkey Kong (The Planet of Donkey Kong). The French-language version of the show later premiered in Canada on Télétoon on September 8, 1997, making the series one of the channel's launch programs, while the English version premiered on its English counterpart on October 17, also as a launch program. In the U.S., it was one of the first series to be shown on Fox Family (now Freeform), in which the series was broadcast in its entirety from August 15, 1998 (the same day Fox Family was launched) until 2000. It was also seen on Fox Kids from 1998 to 1999 for a very short time airing two episodes as specials on December 19, 1998, and aired a few more episodes during the summer of 1999 before being taken off. 40 episodes were produced. In Japan, the series aired with a Japanese dub and took over TV Tokyo's 6:30 p.m. time-slot from Gokudo the Adventurer airing on October 1, 1999, and was later replaced with Hamtaro after ending on June 30, 2000.

Over the years, the series has been released throughout many VHS and DVDs in several countries. In total, 13 DVDs around the world were released with English audio.

For North America, four episodes of Donkey Kong Country that feature Kaptain Skurvy were edited together into a videocassette release titled Donkey Kong Country: The Legend of the Crystal Coconut and was marketed as a feature-length anthology film. However, these episodes are not in chronological order, as a flashback shown in the third episode actually occurs in the fourth episode of the tape. It was released in Canada around 1999 with both English and French dub tapes separately with distribution handled by Seville Pictures and Nelvana themselves as the secondary distributor. The United States version of the tape was distributed by Paramount Home Video and was released in the nation on November 9, 1999, marking this the only time that the U.S. had a VHS release of this series. France has gotten a release of this tape as well under: Donkey Kong Le Film!

In Japan, the TV series was very popular and proven to be successful, since the video game that the series is based on was also a hit. It was also because the Japanese dubbed version of the series was produced with a very high budget thus investing to having a big-name well known voice cast. On top of that, the Japanese and also the Latin Spanish dub editions had ad-libbed a lot of extra humour that were not in the original scripts. The Japanese dubbed version of the entire series has been released on home video through Rental VHS tapes in 2000. Shogakukan Video has released all the episodes of the series spreading through 13 volumes and they were sold by Nippon Columbia, a record label company. Each tape contains three episodes each and in consistent order of its Japanese broadcasting on TV Tokyo, with the exception of its series' final episode, Message in a Bottle Show was not included due to mostly being a clip episode. That episode was later introduced as part of another TV Tokyo program which is a quiz show known as Ohashi.

In the PAL regions, Donkey Kong Country Vol. 1 (released in Australia) and Donkey Kong Country - Bad Hair Day (released in the United Kingdom) were released on DVD. The other two DVDs, Donkey Kong Country: Hooray for Holly Kongo Bongo and Donkey Kong Country: The Kongo Bongo Festival of Lights (both released in Australia) only held one episode. After over three years of no new English DVD, I Spy With My Hairy Eye was released in the United Kingdom in 2008.

In 2013, Phase 4 Films, a small Canadian low-budget film company, officially purchased the rights to license and distribute the series for a DVD release in Region 1 along with Sony Pictures Home Entertainment and began releasing episodes starting off with the He Came, He Saw, He Kong-quered DVD that was released on August 20. The Complete First Season was then released on DVD in Region 1 on May 12, 2015.

In 2017, Pidax Film has gotten the distribution rights in Germany to release all fourteen episodes of Season 2 on DVD with English and German dubbing audio included. Germany still has yet to get a release of the first season.

As of 2022, the show is now added on the Tubi streaming service.

The episodes of the show are all available on iTunes and on the Amazon Prime's Ameba channel. The first two seasons are available on Freevee and on Amazon Video with advertisements.

39 of 40 episodes are available on Retro Rerun's YouTube channel.

Legacy
The show had a large line of merchandise in Japan, including a manga and collectible card game featuring drawings of characters—some of which never appeared in the series. The card game was later adapted to be based on Donkey Kong 64.

Pirate's Scorn, a song from the show, was covered by Scottish heavy metal band Alestorm in their Curse of the Crystal Coconut album. This cover of Pirate's Scorn was also included in DKC: Curse of the Crystal Coconut, an animated fan tribute to the show. Additionally, the album artwork contains several nods to the Donkey Kong video game franchise.

In the Nintendo Switch version of Donkey Kong Country: Tropical Freeze, the "banana slamma" catchphrase is used in one of Tawks' lines when visiting Funky's Fly 'n Buy while playing as Funky Kong, paying an homage to the animated series.

References

External links
 
 Donkey Kong Country at Nelvana.com
 List of Japanese products based on the series
 Donkey Kong Country at Retro Junk

Donkey Kong
Animated series based on Nintendo video games
1990s Canadian animated television series
2000s Canadian animated television series
Canadian children's animated adventure television series
Canadian children's animated fantasy television series
Canadian children's animated musical television series
1997 Canadian television series debuts
2000 Canadian television series endings
Television series by Nelvana
Canadian children's animated comedy television series
Television series based on Nintendo video games
Teletoon original programming
Canadian computer-animated television series
Canal+ original programming
French computer-animated television series
1990s French animated television series
1996 French television series debuts
2000 French television series endings
French children's animated adventure television series
French children's animated comedy television series
French children's animated fantasy television series
French children's animated musical television series
Chinese children's animated adventure television series
Chinese children's animated comedy television series
Chinese children's animated fantasy television series
Animated television series about apes
Animated television series about monkeys
France Télévisions children's television series
France Télévisions television comedy
Fox Broadcasting Company original programming
Fox Family Channel original programming
TV Tokyo original programming
Fox Kids
Canadian television shows based on video games